Muhammad Dwi Rafi Angga (born October 19, 1996) is an Indonesian professional footballer who plays as a striker for Liga 2 club Bekasi City.

Club career

PSS Sleman
He was signed for PSS Sleman to play in Liga 1 in the 2021 season. Rafi Angga made his debut on 5 September 2021 in a match against Persija Jakarta at the Pakansari Stadium, Cibinong.

Dewa United (loan)
In 2021, Angga signed a contract with Indonesian Liga 2 club Dewa United, on loan from PSS Sleman. He made his league debut on 5 October against Perserang Serang at the Gelora Bung Karno Madya Stadium, Jakarta. On 23 December 2021, Angga scored his first goal for Dewa United against PSMS Medan in the 87th minute at the Pakansari Stadium, Cibinong.

Career statistics

Club

Notes

Honours

Club 
PSS Sleman
 Menpora Cup third place: 2021
Dewa United
 Liga 2 third place (play-offs): 2021

References

External links
 Dwi Rafi Angga at Soccerway
 Dwi Rafi Angga at Liga Indonesia

1996 births
Living people
Indonesian footballers
PSIM Yogyakarta players
PSS Sleman players
Liga 1 (Indonesia) players
Liga 2 (Indonesia) players
Sportspeople from Medan
Association football forwards
Dewa United F.C. players